San Sai may refer to several places in Thailand:

San Sai District
San Sai, Fang
San Sai, Phrao
San Sai, Saraphi
San Sai, Mae Chan
San Sai, Mueang Chiang Rai